Jacques Ferrier is an architect and urban planner.

Biography
Following his architectural training at the École Nationale Supérieure d’Architecture de Paris-Belleville and the École Centrale de Paris, he created his own architecture firm, Jacques Ferrier Architecture, in Paris in 1993. His portfolio of work includes cultural and leisure facilities (such as the France Pavilion for Expo 2010 Shanghai and water park Aqualagon in Villages Nature Paris), showcase buildings (such as the head office of Champagnes Piper & Charles Heidsieck in Reims, the head office of publishers Hachette Livre in Vanves near Paris and the Airbus Delivery Centre in Toulouse), public buildings (notably the Collège de France in Paris, the headquarters of Métropole Rouen Normandie and the French International School of Beijing).

His projects follow a clear philosophy: creating architecture and cities for a creative and sustainable society.

In 2010, Jacques Ferrier and Pauline Marchetti, in collaboration with the philosopher Philippe Simay, created Sensual City Studio, a research laboratory devoted to a forward-looking, humanistic and sensitive approach to the city and architecture.

Jacques Ferrier is the author of a number of works and articles on the subject of architecture. His architectural work has been the subject of many publications, especially The Architecture of Jacques Ferrier (Thames&Hudson, London. He has been the recipient of a number of prizes and awards in France and abroad, including LEAF and BEX awards in London, Architizer A+Award in New-York, and Highly Commended mention at the WAF 2016 in Berlin.

In 2016 and 2017, several monographic exhibitions dedicated to his work were organized: ‘Impressionismus at the Architektur Galerie Berlin, ‘Non oppressive Design’ at the DOKK1 in Aarhus, ‘A vision for the Sensual City’ in Manila, Singapore, Jakarta and Kuala Lumpur.

Jacques Ferrier is qualified to teach in French architectural schools (as “Professeur des Écoles d’Architecture”). He has been made both a Chevalier de l’Ordre National du Mérite and a Chevalier des Arts et des Lettres.

Vision
The Sensual City is a project that answers the urgent question of what urban planning should be both today and tomorrow. The urban culture developed in the 20th century is steadily expanding and over half the world’s population now lives in cities, a proportion that is continually increasing and causing functional problems on an unprecedented scale. It is a situation that threatens our planet’s resources, as well as the way we live together in cities. In the western world, there is a need to go beyond the traditional model of the historical urban model – European and American - take a fresh look not only at the city core, but also at the suburbs, the infrastructure, the transportation systems... and accept that they represent a fully-fledged contemporary urban landscape. Throughout the world and on all continents, giant cities with over ten million inhabitants are taking form. In the 21st century, hundreds of millions of people will find themselves living in an exclusively urban environment, an artificial universe in which technology will be omnipresent.

With the Sensual City, the intention is to develop an alternative approach, one in which technology is not obtrusive nor an end in itself. On the contrary, as technology is perfected it becomes invisible, it disappears from view and allows people to live in cities that can be construed as built landscapes, designed to offer a full sensorial experience. The city becomes an environment that incorporates a high level of sustainable development as well as a setting where people can take pleasure in living together and relate to its history as the founding source of civilization. To achieve these ends, it is essential that the city be deeply rooted to its specific culture, climate and geography.

The Sensual City was the subject of a symposium organized at the Collège de France in September 2009. Internationally recognized personalities - architects, urban planners, scientists, philosophers, sociologists and artists - crossed their eyes on the theme of sensuality linked to architecture and city planning.

AchievementsMinistère de la Culture

Main works 

 2018 : Restructuring of a bullring into a multi-purpose arena, Lunel, France
 2018 : Office building T20, Shanghai, China
 2018 : Office complex Yidian 2, Shanghai, China
 2017 : Métropole Rouen Normandie Headquarters, Rouen, France
 2017 : Aqualagon Waterpark for Villages Nature Paris (Eurodisney & Center Parcs), Marne-la-Vallée, France
 2017 : Tour Lumière, Tours, France
 2016 : Région Île-de-France Headquarters, phase 1, Saint-Ouen, France
 2016 : French International School of Beijing, China
 2016 : Real estate Quatuor - phase 1, Angers, France
 2016 : Naval Group campus, Toulon, France
 2015 : Housing complex « La Mantilla », Montpellier, France
 2015 : Nakâra 4* Resiencial Hotel, Cap d’Agde, France
 2015 : Yidian Office Campus, Shanghai, China
 2015 : Bikers mutual Fund Headquarters, Pérols, France
 2014 : Hachette Livre Headquarters, Vanves, France
 2014 : Rénovation of the Collège de France, Paris, France
 2014 : Dominium housing complex, Montpellier, France
 2012 : ZAC Claude-Bernard Office building, Paris, France
 2011 : Housing, Romainville, France
 2011 : Jiading dormitory, China
 2010 : Pavillon France, Shanghai Expo 2010, China
 2010 : Museum, Xi’an, Chine
 2009 : Multi-purpose hall and theatre extension, Le Cannet, France
 2009 : Les Reflets du Drac, office building, Grenoble, France
 2009 : Sulwhasoo Flagship store, Hong Kong, China
 2009 : Jiading ZhuQiao School, Shanghai, Chine
 2009 : Marcel Saupin, House of human science, Nantes, France
 2008 : Champagnes Piper et Charles Heidsieck Headquarters, Reims, France
 2008 : Sailing Mueum Eric-Tabarly, Lorient, France
 2008 : Fire and rescue station, Saint-Nazaire, France
 2008 : Cardiological and pneumological rehabilitation center, Pont d’Héry, France
 2007 : Centre de maintenance au HUB Roissy-Charles-de-Gaulle, France
 2007 : Etablissement scolaire de Qingpu, Shanghai, Chine
 2007 : Museum of French immigration to Canada, Tourouvre, France
 2006 : Delivery Centre pour Airbus, Toulouse, France
 2006 : Tram system shed, Valenciennes, France
 2006 : Tenesol head office and factory, Toulouse, France
 2006 : Laget Barruel House, Tressan, Hérault, France
 2005 : Hypergreen, research project in partnership with Lafarge
 2005 : Phénix Concept House, prototype house in Meaux, France
 2004 : Air France Industries à Paris-Orly, France
 2004 : Phénix Concept Office, prototype de bureaux HQE, en partenariat avec EDF
 2003 : RATP office building, Paris, France
 2003 : inter-regional laboratory, Oullins, France
 2002 : Louis-Jouvet highschool, Gamaches, France
 2001 : University library and administrative offices, Lille, France
 2001 : Maison des Cannisses, Limoux, France
 1999 : Isomer laboratory for the University of Nantes, France
 1999 : Total Energie Headquarters, La-Tour-de-Salvagny, France
 1999 : Renault vehicle testing facility, Guyancourt, France
 1998 : Inria laboratories, Sophia-Antipolis, France
 1998 : SAGEP water treatment plant, Joinville-le-Pont, France
 1993 : Material Science Research Center for the Ecole des Mines de Paris, Evry, France
 1990 : SAS Institute, rehabilitation of a castel, Gregy-sur-Yerres, France

Ongoing Projects 

 CO’Met sports hall, congress center and exhibition center, Orléans, France
 Housing and hotels concept in Matinha, Lisbonne, Portugal
 Uptown village, Vilamoura, Portugal
 3M Headquarters, Cergy-Pontoise, France
 International Conference Center of Pudong, Shanghai, China
 Région Ile-de-France Headquarters, phase 2, Saint-Ouen, France
 KM 21, Huangpu River, Shanghai, China
 Reinventing Paris, Ternes-Villiers, Paris, France
 Tram T9, Garage and maintenance hub, Paris-Orly Ville, France
 La Tuilerie cultural center, Limoux, France
 New Seaport Passenger Terminal, Sète, France
 Grand Central Saint-Lazare real estate, Paris, France
 Design and architectural consultant for the Grand Paris Express rapid transit, Île-de-France, France
 Quatuor real estate (offices, hotel, student residence), Angers, France
 Marseille Station 7 - Corail, Marseille, France

City Planning 

 2015: Urban & architectural planning of a coastline to urbanise, Cap d’Agde, France
 2014: Urban reconversion of the PSA industrial zone, near Paris, France (ongoing)
 2012: Zac Carmes Madeleine, Orleans, France
 2011: Saint Germain-en-Laye, Lisière Péreire, France (ongoing)
 2010: EuroRennes, Rennes, France (ongoing)
 2010: Jiading High Tech Park, Shanghai, China (ongoing) 
 2010: Requalification of the French infantry school, Montpellier, France (competition)
 2010: New area of the former site of the prisons of Lyon, in association with TER (competition)
 2009: Urban planning of the Ile Seguin, Boulogne-Billancourt, France (competition)
 2009: Urban study in Xi’an, China
 2009: New Punggol Waterway, Singapore (competition)
 2009: Urban planning of the Ko-Bogen area, Düsseldorf, Germany (competition)
 2007: Paris in height workshop, research for the city of Paris, France
 2007: Aerospace Campus of Toulouse, France
 2006: Cancer Campus, Villejuif, France (study)
 2006: Olympic Village Paris 2012, France (competition)
 2004: Definition studies, conversion of Kodak sites, Sevran, France
 2003: Studies for an urban park with housing dedicated to digital images, Arles, France
 2002: Center of Excellence, Roissy-Gonesse, France (competition)
 2001/ 2004: Urban land use studies for Renault properties, Boulogne-Billancourt, France

Scenography 

 2010: French Pavilion design, Shanghai, China 
 2003: Jean Prouvé exhibition design, Nancy, France
 1997: Paris Sous-Verre exhibition design, Pavillon de l’Arsenal, Paris

Design 

 2010: Aluchair, chairs designed for Ligne Roset

Exhibitions 

 Non Oppressive Design, A Path towards the Sensual City, Dokk1, Aarhus, Denmark (2017)
 A Vision for the Sensual City, White Box, Kuala Lumpur, Malaysia (2017) Noble House, Jakarta, Indonesia (2017) Visma Art Gallery, Surabaya, Indonesia (2017) Urban Redevelopment Authority, Singapore (2016) National Museum of the Philippines, Manila (2016)
 Skin, Double Skin, a Sensual Approach to Building Envelope, Palazzo Beltrade, Milano, Italy (2017)
 Impressionismus, Architektur Galerie, Berlin, Germany (2017)
 Architecture = Durable / Architecture = Sustainable, Jacques Ferrier, commissaire d’exposition scientifique, Pavillon de l’Arsenal, Paris, and French Institutes in various countries (2016)                      
 A Reciprocal Perspective / Un Regard Réciproque, French Institute of Beijing, China; Minsheng Foundation, Shanghai, China (2015)
 La Gare Sensuelle / The Sensual Railway Station, Pavillon de l’Arsenal, Paris, France (2014) La Galerie d’Architecture, Paris, France (2012)

Bibliography 

 A History of Thresholds: Life, Death and Rebirth, co-author with Pauline Marchetti, éd. JOVIS Verlag GmbH, Berlin (2018)
 Belle Méditerranée, La Métropole Sensible / Towards a Sensory Metropolis, Sensual City Studio, éd. Métropolis / Archibooks (2014)
 La Possibilité d’une Ville, éd. Arléa, Paris (2013)
 Architecture = Durable / Architecture = Sustainable, catalogue of the itinerary exhibition, Jacques Ferrier, scientific curator, Pavillon de l’Arsenal, Paris 
 Paris sous Verre, catalogue of the exhibition, Jacques Ferrier co-author with Bernard Marrey, Pavillon de l’Arsenal (1997)
 Construire en Acier, Jacques Ferrier co-auteur, Editions du Moniteur (2014)
 Usines 2, Jacques Ferrier, Ed.Electa-Moniteur, Paris (1991)
 Usines 1, Jacques Ferrier, Ed.Electa-Moniteur, Paris (1987)

Monography 

The Architecture of Jacques Ferrier, Alexander Tzonis and Kenneth Powell, Thames & Hudson, London (2016)
Pavillon France, Exposition universelle de Shanghai 2010, éd. Archibooks, Paris (2010)
Cité de la Voile Eric-Tabarly, Silvana Editoriale, Milan/AAM Ed., Bruxelles/Ante Prima, Paris (2008)
Making of, Phare & Hypergreen Towers, AAM Ed./Ante Prima, Paris (2006)
Concept Office, architecture prototype, AAM Ed./Ante Prima (2005)
Useful/ Utiles, The Poetry of Useful Things, La Poésie des Choses Utiles, Birkhäuser Basel-Boston-Berlin /Ante Prima, Paris (2004)
Stratégies du disponible, éd. Passage Piétons, Paris (2004)

References 

1959 births
Living people
People from Limoux
École Centrale Paris alumni
20th-century French architects
21st-century French architects
Chevaliers of the Ordre des Arts et des Lettres
Knights of the Ordre national du Mérite
Members of the Académie d'architecture